Super Market may refer to:

 Super Market (Karachi)
 Super Market (Islamabad)

See also
 Supermarket